The Confession was an American heavy metal band from Dana Point, California. Shortly after their formation in 2005, they went on to tour with such bands as Avenged Sevenfold, Bullet for My Valentine and Megadeth and were slotted on Rockstar's 2006 Taste of Chaos tour. The band announced their breakup on January 15, 2008 after touring with Avenged Sevenfold. In the three years that The Confession were together, they released a self-titled five-song EP and their only full-length album, Requiem (produced by M. Shadows of Avenged Sevenfold).

The track "Through These Eyes" was featured on EA's racing game Burnout Dominator. The EP version of "Jealousy" appears in ATV Offroad Fury 4.

Band members
Final lineup
 Taylor Holland Armstrong — vocals (2005–2008)
 Kevin Fyfe — guitar (2005–2008)
 Justin Norman — guitar (2006–2008)
 Matt Pauling — guitar (2005–2006), bass (2006–2008)
 Jeff Veta — drums (2005–2008)

Former members
 Jake "Snake" Ortiz — bass (2005–2006)

Discography
 The Confession — October 11, 2005 (Record Collection)
 Requiem — March 20, 2007 (Science Records)

Metalcore musical groups from California
Musical groups from Orange County, California
Warner Records artists